Ramon Naval Guico Jr. (born December 10, 1953) is a Filipino politician who is the representative of Pangasinan's 5th congressional district since 2022. He is the President of the League of Municipalities of the Philippines (LMP) and former mayor of Binalonan, Pangasinan. He recently launched the Ginhawa Mo, Gets (Gamot, Edukasyon, Trabaho, Serbisyo) Ko Agad Campaign which aims to strengthen the local government and provide faster and improved services to the people. He ran for Senator in the 2010 elections but lost.

He is the third child of Ramon Sr. and Vicenta, of Pangasinan and Isabela. A born entrepreneur, Ramon at age 5 and all throughout his elementary and high school was already helping her mother, “Aling Quita” in their store. He was a known student leader and was the President of his high school student council.

Ramon went to Baguio for college and took up civil engineering at the University of Baguio. He met his future wife, Arlyn, a pharmacist, in the nearby town of Santo Tomas.

Business career
In the early 1970s and while newly married, Guico began poultry and hog-raising business. He then dived his business into gravel and sand by buying junk Pantranco buses to be used for transport of sand and moon. This earned him the moniker, "Magbubulok" or Junk Man by his relatives and friends. Guico then ventured into the construction business where he built dams and farm-to-market roads. In 1985, he then entered the business of health care and education, which by then was the largest business venture he had undertaken.

Political career

In 1987, Guico was appointed by President Cory Aquino as mayor of Binalonan, Pangasinan. Binalonan was a 5th class municipality when Guico took office.

Guico also served as President of the League of Municipalities of the Philippines. 
To correct the image of LMP as nothing but a forum for mayors to socialize, Ramon used the LMP as a platform for mayors to share their practices. During his first term as LMP National President, he launched the Ang Galing mo Mayor (You are the Best Mayor) Project as LMP’s serious efforts to promote innovation and excellence in local governance.

During Ramon’s second term, the LMP founded the Mayor’s Development Center (MDC), a first in Philippine local government organization, and even the first in Asia.

References

External links
 ramonguico.com
 getskoagad.com

1953 births
Living people
People from Pangasinan
University of Baguio alumni
Mayors of places in Pangasinan
Filipino engineers
Filipino Roman Catholics
Lakas–CMD politicians
20th-century Filipino businesspeople
21st-century Filipino businesspeople